Rindge may refer to:

 Rindge, New Hampshire
 Rindge Tech, predecessor to Cambridge Rindge and Latin School
 Daniel Rindge (fl. 18th century), American soldier and settler, also reputed namesake of Rindge, New Hampshire
 Frederick H. Rindge (1857—1905), American entrepreneur, philanthropist, & writer
 Frederick H. Rindge (entomologist), fl. 1981

See also
 Rindge Co. v. County of Los Angeles, 1923 US federal case
 Rindgenaria, genus of moths
 Rindgea, genus of butterflies